

A 
 Conrad Aiken
 Washington Allston, artist, writer on art
 Maya Angelou, poet, memoirs
 Alan Ansen
 John Ashbery

B 
 James Baldwin
 Djuna Barnes
 Bernard Berenson
 Mary Berenson
 Thomas Berger (novelist)
 John Peale Bishop
 Jane Bowles
 Paul Bowles
 Kay Boyle
 Louis Bromfield
 John Horne Burns
 William S. Burroughs

C 
 Vincent O. Carter
 Jerome Charyn
 Eldridge Cleaver, non- fiction; criminal, leading "Black Panther"
 Ira Cohen, poet, publisher
 Cid Corman
 Gregory Corso
 Malcolm Cowley
 Caresse Crosby
 Harry Crosby, "Black Sun Press"
 Robert Crumb, comics
 E.E. Cummings

D 
 Edward Dahlberg
 William Demby
 Helen DeWitt
 Irene Dische
  Mabel Dodge (Luhan)
 J. P. Donleavy
 Hilda Doolittle, H. D.
 Edward Dorn
 John Dos Passos
 W.E.B. DuBois
 Rikki Ducornet
 Elaine Dundy
 Andrea Dworkin, memoirs, feminist

E 
 T. S. Eliot
 Lucy Ellmann

F 
 Ruth Fainlight
 F. Scott Fitzgerald
 Janet Flanner
 John Gould Fletcher
 Charles Henri Ford
 Robert Lee Frost

G 
 William Gaddis
 William Gibson, science fiction
 Horatio Greenough, artist, essays on art
 Martha Gellhorn, war correspondent, novelist.

H 
 Bret Harte
 Marsden Hartley
 Ernest Hemingway
 Patricia Highsmith
 Chester Himes
 Russell Hoban
 Langston Hughes

I 
 Rachel Ingalls

J 
 Henry James
 Ted Joans
 James Jones

K 
 Steve Katz, in Italy 1959–62

L 
 Robert Lax
 Andrea Lee
 Charles Godfrey Leland
 Robert Littell
 James Lord

M 
 Archibald MacLeish
 David Markson
 Harry Mathews, novels; memoirs; member of Oulipo; editor of "Locus Solus"
 Mary McCarthy
 Claude McKay
 Stuart Merrill
 Henry Miller
 Derek B. Miller

N 
 Harold Norse

O 
 George Oppen
 Mary Oppen

P 
 Robert Maynard Pirsig, popular philosophy
 Katherine Anne Porter
 Ezra Pound
 Frederic Prokosch

R 
 John Reed
 Laura Riding
 Waverly Root, journalism, non- fiction (food)
 Robert Ruark

S 
 James Sallis, crime, science fiction; editor of New Worlds for two years
 George Santayana
 Evelyn Scott
 David Sedaris
 Alan Seeger
 Irwin Shaw
 John Sladek
 Agnes Smedley
 Logan Pearsall Smith
 Robert Pearsall Smith
 Gary Snyder
 Terry Southern
 Frances Steegmuller
 Gertrude Stein
 Donald Ogden Stewart

T 
 Paul Theroux, travel writer

V 
 Gore Vidal

W 
 Glenway Wescott
 Nathanael West, in Paris in autumn 1926 (not for years as often stated)
 Edith Wharton
 Edmund White
 Robert Wilson (director), theatre, film
 Thomas Wolfe
 Constance Fenimore Woolson
 Willard Huntington Wright, crime
 Richard Wright

Y 
 Frank Yerby

Z 

List writers
expatriate writers, List of American